Zeeshan Ali (born 1 January 1970) is a former  Indian Davis Cup player who also competed at the 1988 Summer Olympics in Seoul. The right-hander reached his highest singles ATP ranking on 12 December 1988, when he became the number 126 of the world when he was still 3 weeks short of his 19th birthday.

Career
He remained in the top 130 (with the exception of a couple of weeks) until August 1991. His singles highlights in 1988 included winning the Indian Satellite Circuit, making R2 of the ATP tour event in Schenectady (losing to Johan Kriek in R2) and at the Seoul Olympics (where he lost to Jacob Hlasek in R2), making the finals of a Challenger in [[New Haven, Connecticut|(losing to Vijay Amritraj) and the semifinal of a Challenger in Indonesia. Those performances had taken Zeeshan to 178 in the singles rankings in November 1988, but he then dominated a Satellite circuit in Japan to finish the year as 126 in singles. At the end of 1988, Zeeshan's doubles ranking was at 154.

In 1989, Zeeshan made the quarter finals of a Challenger in Nigeria early in the year, and then qualified into tour events in Key Biscayne, Tokyo (where he beat Leif Shiras before losing to Stefan Edberg in R2), Singapore and London (Queen's Club). In 1989 he played his only Grand Slam match in singles, losing in straight sets to Wally Masur at Wimbledon.Also in 1989, he made third round in doubles at Wimbledon with Jonathan Canter (losing to the seeded pair of Curren and Pate in four sets), and won two Challenger doubles titles (in Kuala Lumpur and Beijing). In 1988, he also made the second round of the Wimbledon doubles (with Mark Ferreira), two Challenger doubles finals (one with Mark) and four Challenger semi-finals (one of them with 37-year-old Anand Amritraj). Even in 1990, he won a Challenger doubles title (in Winnetka, IL) and made another Challenger doubles final (in Kenya), although playing a much lighter schedule. But after 1991, Zeeshan was mainly playing Challengers and Satellites in India and Asia. He won the Gold in the Asian Games in 1994 and Bronze in 1990.

Zeeshan was also ranked number 2 in the world and #1 in Asia in the Juniors in 1986. Zeeshan won a total of 14 ITF junior tournaments that year and reached the semi finals of singles at Junior Wimbledon. Later in the same year Zeeshan also reached the Juniors doubles finals at the US Open. He stopped playing on the professional circuit in 1995 due to a back injury.

Zeeshan has won a total of 7 Indian men's singles and 4 Doubles National Championships. He is the youngest men's national champion having won the first National championship at the age of 16.

Zeeshan played Davis Cup for India from 1987 to 1994. He was the member of the Indian Davis Cup team that reached the Davis Cup Finals in 1987 and Semi Finals in 1993. Zeeshan is the current National and Davis Cup Coach of India and was the Captain of the Indian Fed Cup team in 2015. He is also the Director of Tennis at the National Tennis Centre in Delhi.

In 2014 Zeeshan was awarded the prestigious Dhyan Chand from the President of India for his contribution to tennis in India.

Personal life

Before returning to India in 2012, Zeeshan was running his tennis academy in Dubai and was the Davis Cup Coach of the UAE. He is currently married with two kids and has his tennis academy in Bangalore.

ATP Challenger and ITF Futures finals

Doubles: 4 (3–1)

Junior Grand Slam finals

Doubles: 1 (1 runner-up)

References

External links
 
 
 
 
 Zeeshan Ali Tennis Academy website

1970 births
Living people
Indian expatriate sportspeople in the United Arab Emirates
Indian male tennis players
Olympic tennis players of India
Sportspeople from Dubai
Tennis players from Kolkata
Tennis players at the 1988 Summer Olympics
Asian Games medalists in tennis
Tennis players at the 1990 Asian Games
Tennis players at the 1994 Asian Games
Recipients of the Dhyan Chand Award
Asian Games gold medalists for India
Asian Games bronze medalists for India
Medalists at the 1990 Asian Games
Medalists at the 1994 Asian Games